Archips subgyraleus is a moth of the family Tortricidae. It is found in Vietnam.

The wingspan is 15 mm. The termen of the forewings are cream ochreous, in the basal three-fourths suffused pinkish brown, in the costal area tinged with brown black. The markings and costal fold are blackish brown. The hindwings are cream orange, although they are brownish grey in the anal area.

References

Moths described in 2009
Archips
Moths of Asia
Taxa named by Józef Razowski